Montes may refer to:

Places
 Montes, a very early name of Mons, a city in Belgium
 Montes, West Virginia, United States, an unincorporated community
 Montes, Uruguay, a village

Other uses
 Montes (surname)
 Montes (journal), a Spanish scientific forestry journal
 The plural of Mons (planetary nomenclature), mountains on celestial bodies

See also
 
 Monte (disambiguation)
 Montes-Bradley